In music, the pianto (en:crying) is the motif of a descending minor second, has represented laments and been associated textually with weeping, sighing (called the Mannheim sigh by Hugo Riemann); or pain, grief, etc.; since the 16th century. For example the passus duriusculus. "It was present equally in vocal and instrumental music."

See also
Lament bass

Sources

Motifs (music)
Music semiology